Allium tianschanicum is a plant species native to Xinjiang, Kazakhstan, Kyrgyzstan and Tajikistan.

Allium tianschanicum has a cluster of bulbs each up to 20 cm in diameter. Scape is up to 25 cm long, round in cross-section. Leaves are channeled, up to 15 mm across, shorter than the scape. Umbel is densely packed with many yellow or white flowers.

References

tianschanicum
Onions
Flora of temperate Asia
Plants described in 1869